Michael John Kennedy (born 10 January 1964) is a former Australian rules footballer who played for Carlton in the VFL during the late 1980s. He spent his final season of football at Sydney with the Swans before retiring. He coached VFA club Dandenong in 1992 and 1993 before moving to Box Hill Football Club to play his final season in 1994, returning again as an assistant coach in 1996. In 1998-2000 Michael coached Vermont Football Club, taking out the premiership in 1998..

References

External links

1964 births
Living people
Australian rules footballers from Victoria (Australia)
Carlton Football Club players
Carlton Football Club Premiership players
Sydney Swans players
Dandenong Football Club coaches
One-time VFL/AFL Premiership players